Ishpeming  is a city in Marquette County in the Upper Peninsula of the U.S. state of Michigan. The population was 6,140 at the 2020 census, less than it was in the 1950s and 1960s when the iron ore mines employed more workers. A statue of a Native American figure, erected in 1884 in the small town square, is referred to as "Old Ish".

Ishpeming Township is located to the northwest of the city but is administratively autonomous. Ishpeming is considered the birthplace of organized skiing in the United States and is the home to the National Ski Hall of Fame. The city was also prominently featured in the 2010 documentary Catfish.

The name Ishpeming comes from the Ojibwe word ishpiming, meaning "above", "in the air" or "on high".

Geography
The highlands of Ishpeming and the surrounding area, including the city of Negaunee to its east, receive an unusually high yearly average of lake effect snow.

Demographics

2010 census
As of the census of 2010, there were 6,470 people, 2,824 households, and 1,664 families living in the city. The racial makeup of the city was 96.0% White, 0.2% African American, 1.1% Native American, 0.3% Asian, 0.1% from other races, and 2.2% from two or more races. Hispanic or Latino of any race were 1.0% of the population.

There were 2,824 households, of which 28.3% had children under the age of 18 living with them, 42.0% were married couples living together, 12.2% had a female householder with no husband present, 4.7% had a male householder with no wife present, and 41.1% were non-families. 33.9% of all households were made up of individuals, and 13.4% had someone living alone who was 65 years of age or older. The average household size was 2.23 and the average family size was 2.85.

The median age in the city was 40.3 years. 21.7% of residents were under the age of 18; 8.9% were between the ages of 18 and 24; 25.1% were from 25 to 44; 27.3% were from 45 to 64; and 17% were 65 years of age or older. The gender makeup of the city was 48.2% male and 51.8% female.

2000 census
As of the census of 2000, there were 6,686 people, 2,915 households, and 1,757 families living in the city. The racial makeup of the city was 97.29% White, 0.06% Black, 1.20% Native American, 0.19% Asian, 0.27% from other races, and 0.99% from two or more races. Hispanic or Latino of any race were 0.81% of the population. 25.5% were of Finnish, 14.4% Italian, 14.1% English, 12.4% French, 7.3% German, 5.7% Swedish and 5.1% Irish ancestry according to Census 2000. 95.8% spoke English and 1.9% Finnish as their first language.

There were 2,915 households, out of which 27.7% had children under the age of 18 living with them, 43.8% were married couples living together, 12.3% had a female householder with no husband present, and 39.7% were non-families. 34.0% of all households were made up of individuals, and 15.2% had someone living alone who was 65 years of age or older.  The average household size was 2.25 and the average family size was 2.89.

In the city, the population was spread out, with 23.2% under the age of 18, 9.2% from 18 to 24, 26.9% from 25 to 44, 21.8% from 45 to 64, and 19.0% who were 65 years of age or older.  The median age was 39 years. For every 100 females, there were 89.6 males.  For every 100 females age 18 and over, there were 87.1 males.

The median income for a household in the city was $31,347, and the median income for a family was $38,924. Males had a median income of $36,310 versus $21,104 for females. The per capita income for the city was $16,946.  About 8.0% of families and 11.1% of the population were below the poverty line, including 15.5% of those under age 18 and 6.8% of those age 65 or over.

Transportation

Highways
 passes through the northern portion of Ishpeming, running westerly and northerly toward Houghton, easterly toward Marquette and southeast to Escanaba.
 travels westerly toward Wakefield and east to Marquette.
 BUS M-28 serves the downtowns of both Negaunee and Ishpeming.

Airport
Ishpeming, which is part of the greater Marquette area, is served by Sawyer International Airport with flights to Chicago and Detroit.

Bus
Marquette has a bus system called the "MarqTran" that runs through Ishpeming and nearby places such as Sawyer International Airport & Negaunee. 
Indian Trails bus lines operates daily intercity bus service between Hancock and Milwaukee with a stop in Ishpeming.

Rail
Until 1969, the Chicago & Northwestern Railroad ran its Peninsula 400 to Ishpeming from Chicago. In its last days, the train consisted of one engine and one bi-level passenger car.

Historical events
The movie Anatomy of a Murder was filmed in Ishpeming and surrounding areas in 1959, based on the novel by Ishpeming native John D. Voelker under the pen name Robert Traver. Extensive 50th anniversary celebrations were held in 2009.
 The Green Bay Packers played their first ever road game in Ishpeming on October 19, 1919. The Packers defeated the local Twin City Football Team 33–0.
 At the end of the 19th century almost one third of the population of Åtvidaberg Municipality in Sweden emigrated to Ishpeming, as copper mines in the Åtvidaberg area closed down. In 1994 this was commemorated by a plaquette at the Mormorsgruvan mine of Åtvidaberg.
The National Ski Association, the forerunner of the present-day United States Ski and Snowboard Association, was founded in Ishpeming on February 21, 1905. The founder and president was local banker and skier, Carl Tellefsen.

Climate
This climatic region is typified by large seasonal temperature differences, with warm to hot (and often humid) summers and cold (sometimes severely cold) winters.  According to the Köppen Climate Classification system, Ishpeming has a humid continental climate, abbreviated "Dfb" on climate maps.

Notable people
Chuck Fairbanks, NCAA Division I and NFL Head Football Coach.  IHS Head Coach, 1957, 1958
Tom Izzo, head coach, Michigan State University basketball. Head coach, 1977 Ishpeming High School.
Clarence "Kelly" Johnson, preeminent aviation engineer, designer of Lockheed SR-71 Blackbird and leader at the "skunk works."
Glenn T. Seaborg, Nobel prize winning chemist.
John D. Voelker, author under the pen name Robert Traver, and Michigan state Supreme Court Justice.
Leonard C. Ward, United States Army Brigadier General who served as Chief of the Army Division at the National Guard Bureau and Commander of the 46th Infantry Division.
Da Yoopers, band.
Will H. Bradley, one of the most influential illustrators and designers of the Art Nouveau movement, was an apprentice in Ishpeming at the Iron Agitator, later known as the Iron Ore, from age 11 to 17, when he moved to Chicago.

Points of interest
Al Quaal Recreation Center
Cliffs Shaft Mine Museum, commemorating the history of mining on the Marquette Iron Range
Jasper Knob, a bald topped hill composed entirely of jaspilite; a geological formation of the Marquette Iron Range.
The Mather Inn
National Ski Hall of Fame
Old Ish Statue
 Suicide Hill Ski Jump
 W.C. Peterson Auditorium
 Ishpeming Carnegie Public Library
 Lake Bancroft
Ishpeming Area Historical Society & Museum, clubs, organizations, schools, military, early home life, businesses, maps, Glenn Seaborg, Kelly Johnson, John Voelker, bands and Anatomy of a Murder artifacts.

Education
Ishpeming Public School District No. 1 consisting of:
Ishpeming High School: The school nickname is the Hematites, after the iron ore mined in the city.
Ishpeming Middle School (sharing the high school)
Birchview Elementary School

In the adjacent Ishpeming Township, the NICE Community School District consists of
Westwood High School: Mascot – Patriots
Aspen Ridge Middle School: Mascot – Patriots
Aspen Ridge Elementary School: Mascot – Patriots

INN (Ishpeming-Negaunee-NICE) Community School is an alternative high school located in Ishpeming in a church on Pine Street that consists of about 30 students as of March 2019.

Media 
Ishpeming is the city of license for ABC network affiliate WBUP, channel 10, whose studios are located in Ishpeming while their transmitter is located south of Ely Township in unincorporated Marquette County. Ishpeming is primarily served by the Marquette media market.

Places of worship
Bethany Lutheran Church
Bethel Lutheran Church
Bible Baptist Church
Cross Bridge Church
Christ The King Lutheran Church
Good News Assembly of God
Grace Episcopal Church
Hope Free Evangelical Lutheran Church
Old Fashioned Baptist Church
St. Jacob Orthodox Christian Mission
St. John the Evangelist Catholic Church
St. Joseph Catholic Church
Trinity Lutheran Church
United Evangelical Covenant Church
Wesley United Methodist Church]
The Salvation Army

Festivals and events 
Noquemanon Ski Marathon, January
Ski jumping competition at Suicide Hill
National Ski Hall of Fame membership induction ceremonies
St. Rocco and St. Anthony Society of Ishpeming annual "Italian Fest", July
 Marji Gesick 100 MTB race, Sept.

See also 
Iron Ore, the city's weekly newspaper from 1886 to 1951
Peninsula 400, an express passenger train from Chicago that terminated in Ishpeming until 1969

References

External links
City of Ishpeming

Cities in Marquette County, Michigan
Populated places established in 1873
1873 establishments in Michigan